Budziska may refer to:

Budziska, Kuyavian-Pomeranian Voivodeship (north-central Poland)
Budziska, Lublin Voivodeship (east Poland)
Budziska, Świętokrzyskie Voivodeship (south-central Poland)
Budziska, Garwolin County in Masovian Voivodeship (east-central Poland)
Budziska, Gmina Halinów in Masovian Voivodeship (east-central Poland)
Budziska, Gmina Latowicz in Masovian Voivodeship (east-central Poland)
Budziska, Węgrów County in Masovian Voivodeship (east-central Poland)
Budziska, Silesian Voivodeship (south Poland)
Budziska, Pomeranian Voivodeship (north Poland)
Budziska, Gołdap County in Warmian-Masurian Voivodeship (north Poland)
Budziska, Mrągowo County in Warmian-Masurian Voivodeship (north Poland)